Philip Ng Wan-lung (born September 16, 1977) is a Hong Kong-born American actor, martial artist and action choreographer. He is currently based in Hong Kong.

Early life
Born in Hong Kong on September 16, 1977. Ng's father is Sam Ng. Ng's mother is Frances Ng. Ng immigrated to United States with his family at the age of seven.  Ng spent the majority of his youth in Chicago, Illinois.

Career

Martial arts
Ng began his study of the martial arts with Hung Gar, taught by his uncle and Choy Lay Fut, taught by his father. At the age of 13, Philip Ng began his study of Wing Chun Gung Fu with his uncle, Alan Ang, and Taekwondo with Master Woon S. Shim.

To further his education in the field of Wing Chun Gung Fu, Ng traveled to Hong Kong during the summers and became the student of the Wong Shun-leung, with whom he trained until Wong's passing early in 1997. Before his death, Sifu Wong Shun-leung encouraged Ng to begin instructing students in America to become training partners.

Ng founded the Illini Wing Chun Association at the University of Illinois at Urbana-Champaign. Ng spent five years presiding over the association as both the head instructor and club president.  Time spent at the University had not only awarded Philip a master's degree in education, but training and sparring with other martial stylists gained him the knowledge and applicable skill in the arts of Brazilian Jiu-Jitsu, Western Boxing, Muay Thai and Eskrima. Ng holds a bachelor's degree in Graphic design and a master's degree in Education.

Acting and choreography
Ng returned to Hong Kong in 2002 to pursue a career in acting and martial arts choreography in film and television. In addition to acting, Ng is also an accomplished fight choreographer and action director. He taught school for a year and decided to fulfill his dream of performing in a martial arts film. He quit his job and headed to Hong Kong to try to enter the business. He was introduced to Chin Ka Lok, an action director who needed someone with Ng's background to train the actors and became the assistant martial arts choreographer on a film. Ng worked his way up as a stuntman and featured actor until he achieved his goal of starring in a 2014 martial arts film, Once Upon a Time in Shanghai. He was selected to play Bruce Lee in the 2016  biographical film Birth of the Dragon, which premiered at the Toronto Film Festival on September 13, 2016.

Filmography 
Film

Television

Second Unit Director or Assistant Director:

References

External links 
Official blog and fan site
Weibo page (Chinese mirco-blog)

HKMDB profile
Ng Family Chinese Martial Arts Association

1977 births
Living people
Action choreographers
Male actors from Chicago
American male film actors
American male television actors
Hong Kong emigrants to the United States
Hong Kong male film actors
Hong Kong kung fu practitioners
Hong Kong male taekwondo practitioners
Hong Kong jujutsuka
Hong Kong male karateka
Hong Kong male kickboxers
American eskrimadors
Hong Kong male television actors
Hong Kong wushu practitioners
Hong Kong stunt performers
American stunt performers
American Wing Chun practitioners
21st-century Hong Kong male actors
21st-century American male actors
Wing Chun practitioners from Hong Kong